This is a list of people from the City of Wakefield, a local government district in West Yorkshire, England. This list includes notable people from Wakefield, and the wider district, and so includes people from Normanton, Pontefract, Featherstone, Castleford and Knottingley and other areas. This list is arranged alphabetically by surname:

A
Victor Adebowale, The Lord Adebowale CBE, Baron Adebowale of Thornes

B
 William Baines, pianist
 Ron Barber, politician
 Stan Barstow FRSL, writer
 Nigel Boocock, speedway rider
 Matthew Booth, actor, Emmerdale
 Geoffrey Boycott OBE, former Yorkshire and England cricketer
 Tom Briscoe, rugby league footballer who has played for Hull; currently representing Leeds Rhinos and England
 Thomas Byran VC, recipient of the Victoria Cross in 1917
 Andrew Burt, actor

C
 John Carr, architect
 Claire Cooper, actress
 Martin Creed, artist

D
 Janet Davies, actress
 Reece Dinsdale, actor, Home to Roost, Ahead of the Class, Coronation Street

E
 Harry Earnshaw (1915–1985), racing cyclist
 Monica Edwards, children's novelist
 Mick Exley,  rugby league footballer who played in the 1920s, 1930s and 1940s, for Great Britain, England, Yorkshire, and Wakefield Trinity

F
 Louisa Fennell, painter of local scenes in Wakefield
 Jean Fergusson, actress
 Charles Fernandes (1857–1944), rugby union footballer who played in the 1880s for England, and Leeds
 Helen Fielding, author
 Emily Freeman, athlete
 Martin Frobisher, explorer, found the Northwest Passage
 Neil Fox MBE, rugby league footballer who played in the 1950s, 1960s and 1970s, for England, Yorkshire, Great Britain and Wakefield Trinity

G
 Noel Gay, composer
 George Gissing, novelist and misanthrope
 Chris Greenacre, former footballer, last played for Wellington Phoenix

H
 Bob Haigh, English rugby league footballer who played in the 1960s and 1970s, and coached in the 1970s
 John George Haigh, 1940s serial killer known as the Acid Bath Murderer
Michelle Hardwick, Soap actress best known for playing vet Vanessa Woodfield in Emmerdale since 2012 and hospital receptionist Lizzie Hopkirk in the ITV drama series The Royal.
 Norman Hardy, cricketer
 John Harrison, clockmaker who solved the longitudinal problem, leading to sea power and GMT
 Chanelle Hayes, Big Brother 8 contestant, now a glamour model
 John Healey, politician and the former Financial Secretary to the Treasury
 Barbara Hepworth DBE, sculptor
 Nichi Hodgson, author, journalist and broadcaster
 Keith Holliday, rugby league footballer of the 1950s and 1960s for Great Britain, Yorkshire, and Wakefield Trinity
 Reenie Hollis, bassist in indie band The Long Blondes
Duane Holmes, footballer for Derby County
 David Hope KCVO PC, former Archbishop of York

I
 Benjamin Ingham, 18th-century evangelist

J
 Gary Jarman, member of indie band The Cribs
 Ross Jarman, member of indie band The Cribs
 Ryan Jarman, member of indie band The Cribs

K
Chloe Khan, tv personality and Playboy model
 Cyril Knowles, former footballer for Tottenham Hotspur and England
 Peter Knowles, former footballer for Wolverhampton Wanderers
 Andy Kelly, rugby league player and coach
 Neil Kelly, rugby league player and coach
 Richard Kelly, rugby league player and coach
 Bobby Krlic, musician, producer and film score writer under the moniker The Haxan Cloak

L
 Sir Albert Lamb, newspaper editor
 Derek Lane (born 1974), cricketer
 John Leech (1971–), Lib Dem leader in Manchester, Member of Parliament for Manchester Withington, one of two MPs to rebel against the formation of the 2010 Coalition Government.
 Jimmy Ledgard, 1954 Rugby League World Cup winning rugby league footballer of the 1940s, 1950s and 1960s, for Great Britain, England, and Dewsbury
 Kenneth Leighton, composer
John Liley, Rugby Union player, most notably for Leicester Tigers
 Alison Littlewood, author
 Eric Lockwood (1932–2014), English rugby league footballer who played in the 1950s and 1960s
 Johnny Longden, champion jockey in the United States, founder of Jockey's Guild
 Frederick Lowrie (1868–1902), rugby union footballer who played in the 1880s and 1890s

M
 Andy Madley, Premier League football referee
 Bobby Madley, Premier League football referee 
 Leonard Marson, rugby league footballer of the 1930s, 1940s and 1950s, for England, Yorkshire, and Wakefield Trinity
 Anne O'Hare McCormick, journalist, first woman to win the Pulitzer Prize
 Brian McDermott, rugby league player and coach
 Jane McDonald, singer and television personality
 David Mercer, playwright
 Henry Moore OM CH FBA RBS, sculptor
 Andrew Moynihan VC, recipient of the Victoria Cross in 1855

N
 Bill Nelson, founder, lead guitarist and singer of 1970s progressive rock band Be-Bop Deluxe (founded in Wakefield) and of the New Wave and synthpop group Red Noise; solo music artist
 Ian Nelson, musician and member of synthpop band Fiat Lux; member of 1970s progressive rock band Be-Bop Deluxe; younger brother of Bill
 Paul Newlove, former professional rugby league footballer; current school teacher

P
 Ian Parkin, rhythm guitarist of the original line-up of 1970s progressive rock band Be-Bop Deluxe
 David Peace, author
 Arthur Uther Pendragon (born 1954), activist and self-declared reincarnation of King Arthur
 Dave Penney, former manager of Doncaster Rovers FC, now manager of Darlington FC
 Carolyn Pickles, actress, great-niece of Wilfred Pickles
 Harold Poynton, rugby league footballer of the 1950s, 1960s and 1970s, for Great Britain, Yorkshire, and Wakefield Trinity

R
 John Radcliffe , scientist and founder of the eponymous library in Oxford
 Don Robinson, 1954 Rugby League World Cup winning rugby league footballer of the 1950s and 1960s, for Great Britain, Wakefield Trinity, and Leeds

S
 Ian Sampson, former English footballer, formerly managed Northampton Town FC
 Ian Sampson, rugby league player, Bramley, Hunslet RFLFC
 Annabel Scholey, actress
 Jayne Sharp, TV presenter
 Richard Stoker, composer
 David Storey, novelist and playwright
 Jill Summers, actress
 Paul Sykes, heavyweight boxer

T
Alan M. Taylor, economist
Mike Tindall MBE, England and Gloucester Rugby Union player
 Jane Tomlinson CBE, athlete and cancer charity fundraiser (from Rothwell in Leeds, on Wakefield border)
 Derek Turner, 1960 Rugby League World Cup winning rugby league footballer of the 1940s, 1950s and 1960s, for Great Britain, England, Hull Kingston Rovers, Oldham, and Wakefield Trinity

U
 Robert Ullathorne, former Premiership footballer with Norwich City, Leicester City

W
 Charles Waterton, naturalist
 Helen Worth, longtime Coronation Street cast-member
 John Wolfenden, Baron Wolfenden, author of the report on the law concerning homosexuality and prostitution.  Although born in Wiltshire, Wolfenden grew up in Wakefield and attended Queen Elizabeth Grammar School, Wakefield.

See also
 List of people from West Yorkshire

References

 
Wakefield
People from Wakefield